James Fair may refer to:

James Graham Fair (1831–1894), U.S. Senator and businessman
James Fair (field hockey) (born 1981), English field hockey player
James R. Fair (1920–2010), American chemical engineer